Robert Leonard Burch Jr. (born September 30, 1949) is an American politician of the Democratic party.

In 1994, Burch, then an Ohio state senator, was the Democratic nominee for Ohio governor and he ran to unseat incumbent Republican Gov. George Voinovich. Burch's campaign was woefully underfunded against Voinovich's $8 million warchest and although he campaigned hard, his name never registered with the public and he was buried in the general election, winning only a quarter of the vote and joining his fellow Ohio Democrats in a series of defeats.

In 1996 and 1998, Burch ran for a seat in the United States House of Representatives (Ohio's 18th district), but lost to incumbent Republican Robert W. Ney both times.

See also
 Election Results, Ohio Governor
 Election Results, Ohio Governor (Democratic Primaries)
 Election Results, U.S. Representative from Ohio, 18th District

References

1946 births
Living people
Ohio state senators
Politicians from Louisville, Kentucky